Liban Haji Mohamed is a Somali al-Shabaab member wanted by the Federal Bureau of Investigation.

Early life 
Mohamed was born in Somalia, but later moved to Alexandria, Virgina.

Criminal background 
Mohamed fled America to Somalia in 2012 to join al-Shabaab, he made a video with al-Shabaab members and attempted to use the propaganda videos to recruit people to join al-Shabaab, he would get caught and indicted after he tried to recruit an undercover FBI agent.  This would lead Mohamed to get indicted on providing material support for a terrorism charge in 2020, which later would cause him to be added to the FBI most wanted terrorist list.

References 

Living people
Fugitives
Al-Shabaab (militant group) members
African people
Criminals
Salafi jihadists
Year of birth missing (living people)